Atmah was the personal yacht of Baron Edmond James de Rothschild.

During World War I she was on active service for the British Admiralty.

In 1940, ownership based to James Armand de Rothschild, and the ship was used by the Admiralty during the war. In 1947, she was bought by Chagris Steamship Co Ltd (Goulandris Bros), London, and converted to a passenger ship and renamed Aegean Star, before being broken up in La Spezia at the end of 1950.

References

1898 ships
Motor yachts
Ships built in Scotland
Edmond James de Rothschild